Megalomyrmex drifti is a Neotropical species of ants in the subfamily Myrmicinae. The species is widespread in tropical South America, north through Central America to southern Mexico.

M. drifti occurs in moist to wet forest habitats, in mature and second growth forest. Most collections are from below 600 m elevation, but collections from 1500 m cloud forest are known. Workers and occasionally queens are moderately abundant in Winkler samples of sifted litter.

References

External links

Myrmicinae
Insects described in 1961
Hymenoptera of South America
Hymenoptera of North America